Rolleston on Dove is a village and a civil parish in the district of East Staffordshire, Staffordshire, England.  It contains 28 listed buildings that are recorded in the National Heritage List for England.  Of these, one is listed at Grade I, the highest of the three grades, and the others are at Grade II, the lowest grade.  Most of the listed buildings are houses, cottages, farmhouses, farm buildings and associated structures.  The other listed buildings include a church, items in the churchyard, a former school, almshouses and associated structures, and public houses.


Key

Buildings

References

Citations

Sources

Lists of listed buildings in Staffordshire